Kharlamovo is a rural locality (a village) in Posyolok Velikodvorsky, Gus-Khrustalny District, Vladimir Oblast, Russia. The population was 4 as of 2010.

Geography 
Kharlamovo is located on the Dandur River, 52 km south of Gus-Khrustalny (the district's administrative centre) by road. Velikodvorye is the nearest rural locality.

References 

Rural localities in Gus-Khrustalny District